The women's discus throw event at the 2006 Commonwealth Games was held on March 21.

Results

References
Results

Discus
2006
2006 in women's athletics